Palaeotrochidae is an extinct family of fossil snails, gastropod mollusks in the clade Neritimorpha according to the taxonomy of the Gastropoda (Bouchet & Rocroi, 2005).

This is the only family in the superfamily Palaeotrochoidea. This family has no subfamilies.

Genera 
Genera within the family Paleotrochidae include:
 Palaeotrochus Hall, 1879 - type genus
 Floyda Webster, 1905
 Turbonopsis Grabau and Shimer 1909
 Westerna Webster, 1905
 Westwooditrochus Cook 1998

References